The Ball and the Cross is a novel by G. K. Chesterton. The title refers to a more worldly and rationalist worldview, represented by a ball or sphere, and the cross representing Christianity. The first chapters of the book were serialized from 1905 to 1906 with the completed work published in 1909. The novel's beginning involves debates about rationalism and religion between a Professor Lucifer and a monk named Michael. A part of this section was quoted in Pope John Paul I's Illustrissimi letter to G. K. Chesterton. Much of the rest of the book concerns the dueling, figurative and somewhat more literal, of a Jacobite Catholic named Evan Maclan and an atheist Socialist named James Turnbull. Lynette Hunter has argued that the novel is more sympathetic to Maclan, but does indicate Maclan is also presented as in some ways too extreme. Turnbull, as well, is presented in a sympathetic light: both duelists are ready to fight for and die for their antagonistic opinions and, in doing so, develop a certain partnership that evolves into a friendship. The real antagonist is the world outside, which desperately tries to prevent from happening a duel over "mere religion" (a subject both duelists judge of utmost importance).

Many have seen echoes in the novel of Chesterton's own longstanding and very public debates over religion with his friend, George Bernard Shaw.

References

External links 

 The Ball and the Cross etext at G. K. Chesterton's Works on the Web.

Dale Ahlquist: The Ball and the Cross, Lecture 15 of the "Chesterton 101" of the American Chesterton Society

1909 British novels
Novels by G. K. Chesterton